Iwakisan may refer to:

11092 Iwakisan, asteroid
Mount Iwaki, stratovolcano